Christiano Florêncio da Silva known by his nickname, Pedrão (born April 5, 1978 in Jaboticabal), is a Brazilian football striker. He currently plays for América-SP.

Career
He joined South Korean side Seongnam Ilhwa Chuma and appeared only three matches in Korean League Cup.

Titles

Barueri
 São Paulo A3 State League: 2005
 São Paulo A2 State League: 2006
 São Paulo Interior State League: 2008

External links
Goiás signs Pedrão (in Portuguese)
 

1978 births
Living people
People from Jaboticabal
Brazilian footballers
Brazilian expatriate footballers
Clube Atlético Linense players
Botafogo Futebol Clube (SP) players
Grêmio Barueri Futebol players
Goiás Esporte Clube players
Associação Desportiva São Caetano players
Comercial Futebol Clube (Ribeirão Preto) players
Sertãozinho Futebol Clube players
Associação Portuguesa de Desportos players
Esporte Clube Vitória players
América Futebol Clube (SP) players
São Raimundo Esporte Clube footballers
Al Shabab Al Arabi Club Dubai players
Seongnam FC players
K League 1 players
Expatriate footballers in South Korea
Expatriate footballers in the United Arab Emirates
Association football forwards
UAE Pro League players
Footballers from São Paulo (state)